Mycena is a large genus of small saprotrophic mushrooms that are rarely more than a few centimeters in width. They are characterized by a white spore print, a small conical or bell-shaped cap, and a thin fragile stem. Most are gray or brown, but a few species have brighter colors. Most have a translucent and striate cap, which rarely has an incurved margin. The gills are attached and usually have cystidia. Some species, like Mycena haematopus, exude a latex when the stem is broken, and many species have a chlorine or radish-like odor.

The name Mycena comes from the Ancient Greek μύκης , meaning "fungus". Species in the genus Mycena (and in Hemimycena) are commonly known as bonnets.

Description
Mycenas are hard to identify to species and some are distinguishable only by microscopic features such as the shape of the cystidia. Some species are edible, while others contain toxins, but the edibility of most is not known, as they are likely too small to be useful in cooking. Mycena pura contains the mycotoxin muscarine, but the medical significance of this is unknown. 

In terms of morphology, Mycena mushrooms are notably minute in their size (anywhere from 0.5 to ~15cm in cap-size). Pileate-stipitate in form, there can exist a wide range in both the anatomical characteristics and color of the basidiocarps -- though most often basidiocarps are grey or brown. Veils and volva presence in the morphology is not observed.  The hymenium is most often either lamellate or poroid, dependent upon the species. Spores are smooth and can be amyloid or non-amyloid, also dependent upon the species. Some species also secrete a latex-like fluid when damaged at the base of the stem.

Over 58 species are known to be bioluminescent, creating a glow known as foxfire. These species are divided among 16 lineages, leading to evolutionary uncertainty in whether the luminescence developed once and was lost among many species, or evolved in parallel by several species. One advantage of bioluminescence may lie in its potential to attract insects that can disperse the mushroom's spores. 

Bioluminescence in the genus occurs as a reaction between oxygen and luciferin molecules catalyzed by the enzyme luciferase. In recent years, mycologists have conducted research examining the development of bioluminescence within fungi, investigating the origin of the genes coding for luciferase enzymes that cause these fantastic visible traits. So far, the literature suggests 3 separate origins of bioluminescence within Agaricales, occurring within the families Omphalotaceae,  Physalacriaceae, and Mycenaceae.

Ecology
Traditionally, the group has been thought to play a purely saprotrophic role in the environment, mostly occurring on hardwoods and producing white rots -- though it should be mentioned that some plant pathogens have also been discovered. Additionally, it is also worth noting that, in a more recent study, Thoen et al. challenges the traditional view that the genus is saprobic ecological role, suggesting instead that the ability of Mycena to form plant root interactions in vitro may indicate the capability to establish ectomycorrhizal relationships with a host.

Taxonomy
Mycena is a rich genus, considered one of the most abundant genera of mushrooms within the Agaricales and with species distributed across the world.

Alexander Smith's 1947 Mycena monograph identified 232 species; the genus is now known to include about 500 species worldwide. Maas Geesteranus divided the genus into 38 sections in 1992, providing keys to each for all the species of the Northern Hemisphere. Many new species have been discovered since then, and four new sections have been proposed. Taxonomy is complex, as most sections are not truly homogeneous, and the keys fail for some species, especially those that satisfy some criteria for only part of their life cycle. Some sections contain only one species.

Selected species

 M. abramsii
 M. acicula
 M. adonis
 M. adscendens
 M. aetites
 M. albidocapillaris
 M. alcalina
 M. alnicola
 M. alphitophora
 M. amicta
 M. atkinsonii
 M. atkinsoniana
 M. aurantiomarginata
 M. austrofilopes
 M. austrororida
 M. arcangeliana
 M. aspratilis (bioluminescent)
 M. asterina (bioluminescent)
 M. atrata
 M. brunneospinosa
 M. cahaya (bioluminescent)
 M. californiensis
 M. capillaripes
 M. chlorophos (bioluminescent)
 M. chlorophanos (bioluminescent)
 M. cinerella
 M. citricolor
 M. citrinomarginata
 M. clariviolacea
 M. coralliformis (bioluminescent)
 M. cristinae (bioluminescent)
 M. crocata
 M. cyanorrhiza
 M. cystidiosa
 M. daisyogunensis (bioluminescent)
 M. deeptha (bioluminescent)
 M. deformis (bioluminescent)
 M. deusta (bioluminescent)
 M. discobasis (bioluminescent)
 M. domingensis
 M. epipterygia (bioluminescent)
 M. erubescens
 M. fera (bioluminescent)
 M. flavescens
 M. flavoalba
 M. fonticola
 M. fuhreri
 M. fulgoris (bioluminescent)
 M. fusca (bioluminescent)
 M. fuscoaurantiaca
 M. galericulata
 M. galopus (bioluminescent)
 M. griseoviridis
 M. globulispora (bioluminescent)
 M. gombakensis (bioluminescent)
 M. guldeniana
 M. guzmanii (bioluminescent)
 M. haematopus (bioluminescent)
 M. holoporphyra
 M. illuminans (bioluminescent)
 M. inclinata (bioluminescent)
 M. indigotica
 M. interrupta
 M. intersecta
 M. kentingensis (bioluminescent)
 M. kuurkacea
 M. lacrimans (bioluminescent)
 M. lazulina (bioluminescent)
 M. leaiana
 M. lacrimans (bioluminescent)
 M. lanuginosa
 M. leptocephala
 M. lucentipes (bioluminescent)
 M. lumina (bioluminescent)
 M. luteopallens
 M. luxaeterna (bioluminescent)
 M. luxarboricola (bioluminescent)
 M. lux-coeli (bioluminescent)
 M. luxfoliata (bioluminescent)
 M. luxfoliicola (bioluminescent)
 M. luxperpetua (bioluminescent)
 M. maculata (bioluminescent)
 M. manipularis
 M. margarita (bioluminescent)
 M. marasmielloides
 M. metata
 M. minirubra
 M. multiplicata
 M. mustea
 M. nargan
 M. nebula (bioluminescent)
 M. nidificata
 M. nocticaelum (bioluminescent)
 M. noctilucens
 M. oculisnymphae (bioluminescent)
 M. olida
 M. olivaceomarginata (bioluminescent)
 M. oregonensis
 M. overholtsii
 M. perlae (bioluminescent)
 M. pelianthina
 M. polygramma (bioluminescent)
 M. pruinosoviscida (bioluminescent)
 M. pseudostylobates (bioluminescent)
 M. pura (bioluminescent)
 M. pura complex
 M. purpureofusca
 M. renati
 M. rosea (bioluminescent)
 M. rosella
 M. roseoflava (bioluminescent)
 M. sanguinolenta (bioluminescent)
 M. seminau (bioluminescent)
 M. semivestipes
 M. seynii
 M. silvaelucens (bioluminescent)
 M. sinar (bioluminescent)
 M. sinar var. tangkaisinar (bioluminescent)
 M. singeri (bioluminescent)
 M. spinosissima
 M. stipata
 M. strobilinoides
 M. stylobates (bioluminescent)
 M. subcaerulea
 M. sublucens (bioluminescent)
 M. tenuispinosa
 M. tintinnabulum (bioluminescent)
 M. urania
 M. vinacea (bioluminescent)
 M. viscosa
 M. vitilis
 M. vulgaris
 M. zephirus (bioluminescent)

See also
 List of bioluminescent fungus species
 Mycena News, a publication of the Mycological Society of San Francisco

References

Further reading
 Smith, Alexander Hancett. North American Species of Mycena. Ann Arbor: Univ. of Michigan Press, 1947.

External links

 Mushroom Expert - The Genus Mycena
 Key to the Mycenoid Species in the Pacific Northwest
 Fungi Bioluminescence Laboratory
 Online copy of Smith's 1947 Monograph from the University of Michigan Herbarium
 National Geographic Photo in the News, featuring pictures of bioluminescent species
 Keys for Mycena species found in Norway, including a great deal of information on many species

 
Agaricales genera
Bioluminescent fungi